Vicente Revellón (born 4 June 1950) is a Colombian former footballer who competed in the 1972 Summer Olympics.

References

1950 births
Living people
Association football defenders
Colombian footballers
Olympic footballers of Colombia
Footballers at the 1972 Summer Olympics
Independiente Santa Fe footballers